The Mahale Mountains are a mountain range in Uvinza District of Kigoma Region in Tanzania. The mountains are on the eastern shore of Lake Tanganyika.

The range was once the ancestral home of the Holoholo people. Currently the area is a protected wildlife sanctuary, the Mahale Mountains National Park, which harbors chimpanzees and lions.

Holoholo

They were the traditional homeland of the Holoholo people, before being relocated in the 1970s for the creation of Mahale Mountains National Park.

See also

Mountain ranges of Tanzania
Lake Tanganyika
Holoholo